Gaetano Signorini (1806 – 1872) was an Italian painter, active mainly in Parma in depictions of portraits, history, and sacred subjects.

Biography
He was born in Luzzara di Reggio Emilia, the son of the Carlo Signorini. He taught at the Academy of Fine Arts of Parma. Among the subjects of his portraits are:
Jacopo Sanvitale
Luciano Gasparotti
Count Carlo di Bombelles
Count Jacopo Sanvitale
Marchese Paris Boschi
Count di Chambord
Carlo di Bombelles

References

1806 births
1872 deaths
19th-century Italian painters
Italian male painters
Painters from Parma
19th-century Italian male artists